Nie Weiguo (born August 1952) is a Chinese politician.   He is the director of the Engineering Oversight Office of the Three Gorges Dam project.

Nie has occupied numerous Chinese Communist Party positions in Sichuan and Chongqing. He received a degree in political economics from the Central Party School in 1996. From 2005 to 2010, Nie was the political commissar of the Xinjiang Production and Construction Corps. He was a member of the 16th and 17th, and 18th Central Committees of the Chinese Communist Party.

References

1952 births
Living people
People's Republic of China politicians from Chongqing
Chinese Communist Party politicians from Chongqing
Political office-holders in Chongqing
Political office-holders in Xinjiang
Members of the 18th Central Committee of the Chinese Communist Party
Members of the 17th Central Committee of the Chinese Communist Party